The Isle of Man Hospital Cup, also known as the Keystone Law Hospital Cup for sponsorship reasons, is an association football single-elimination tournament held for football clubs in the Isle of Man. It was created in 1921 by Noble's General Hospital, and is overseen by the Isle of Man Football Association. Money is raised for the hospital during matches and a percentage of the final gate receipts to a charity on the Isle of Man. The cup competition includes a group stage and a knock-out stage for all divisions in the Isle of Man Football system.

St. Georges are the current champions, who have won it four times consecutively since 2015, and eleven times overall.

List of champions 

 1921/22 - Gymnasium
 1922/23 - Gymnasium
 1923/24 - Castletown
1924/25 - Peel
1925/26 - Rushen United
1926/27 - unknown  
1927/28 - Rushen United
1928/29 - Peel
1930/31 - Rushen United
1931/32 - Peel
1932/33 - Peel
1933/34 - Peel
1934/35 - Rushen United
1935/36 - Braddan
1936/37 - Braddan
1937/38 - Peel
1938/39 - Rushen United
1945/46 - Braddan    
1947/48 - unknown 
1948/49 - Colby
1949/50 - Castletown
1950/51 - Rushen United
1952/53 - Braddan
1954/55 - St Johns United
1955/56 - Laxey
1956/57 - Corinthians
1958/59 - Michael United
1959/60 - Corinthians
1960/61 - Michael United
1962/63 - Michael United
1963/64 - Rushen United
1967/68 - Peel
1968/69 - Peel
1969/70 - Peel
1970/71 - Pulrose United
1971/72 - Peel
1972/73 - Peel
1973/74 - Malew
1974/75 - Rushen United
1975/76 - Rushen United
1976/77 - Peel
1978/79 - Castletown
1979/80 - Peel
1980/81 - Rushen United
1981/82 - unknown 
1982/83 - Rushen United
1983/84 - Castletown
1984/85 - Castletown
1985/86 - Rushen United
1986/87 - Gymnasium
1987/88 - Douglas HSOB
1988/89 - Rushen United
1989/90 - Peel
1990/91 - Peel
1991/92 - St Georges
1992/93 - Rushen United
1993/94 - St Georges
1994/95 - Douglas HSOB
1995/96 - St Marys 
1996/97 - Peel 
1997/98 - St Marys 
1998/99 - Peel
1999/00 - St Marys 
2000/01 - Rushen United
2001/02 - St Marys  
2002/03 - St Marys 
2003/04 - Laxey
2004/05 - Douglas Royal
2005/06 - Laxey
2006/07 - Laxey
2007/08 - St Georges
2008/09 - St Georges
2009/10 - Peel 
2010/11 - St Georges
2011/12 - St Georges
2012/13 - St Georges
2013/14 - Douglas HSOB
2014/15 - St Georges 
2015/16 - St Georges
2016/17 - St Georges
2017/18 - St Georges
2018/19 - TBD

References 

Football competitions in the Isle of Man